Çardaklı is a village in the Üzümlü District, Erzincan Province, Turkey. The village is populated by Kurds of the Bamasur, Kurêşan and Lolan tribes and had a population of 95 in 2021.

The hamlets of Akınca, Çanaklı, Dermeli, Dikili, Düzali, İkizler, Murat and Topluca are attached to the village.

References 

Villages in Üzümlü District
Kurdish settlements in Erzincan Province